Lindsey Patrice Horvath (born June 30, 1982) is an American politician, advertising executive, and activist who is a member of the Los Angeles County Board of Supervisors for the 3rd District, which covers the San Fernando Valley, and is the Chair Pro Tem of Los Angeles County. She was previously a Councilmember for West Hollywood, California and was twice the mayor.

Early life and career 
Horvath was born in 1982 in Zanesville, Ohio, growing up in Wickliffe, Ohio and Las Vegas, Nevada before going to the University of Notre Dame in Indiana. She has one younger brother but comes from a large family, with her parents being the youngest of multi-sibling households. She attended Catholic schools in Ohio and private high school in Las Vegas. As a teenager, Gloria Allred and Hillary Clinton were some of her role models. While at Notre Dame, Horvath was a registered Republican, but switched her party affiliation to Democratic in 2003. She graduated from the University of Notre Dame in 2004 cum laude with a Bachelor of Arts in political science and gender studies. At Notre Dame, she participated in a performance of The Vagina Monologues which caused controversy with the administration, and also was vice president of the College Republicans.  

She moved to Los Angeles, California after graduating from college intending to go into law school, and attended musical theater school instead. After working in advertising, she founded the Hollywood chapter of the National Organization for Women (NOW). In 2007, she was appointed to the Women's Advisory Board for West Hollywood, and was elected chair after eight months.

Political career

West Hollywood 
In 2009, Horvath was appointed to the West Hollywood City Council after the death Councilman Sal Guarriello, which upset some residents as Horvath had only lived in the city for two years. In 2011, she lost her first election to John D’Amico. On March 3, 2015, she was elected back onto the City Council, defeating John Heilman. After her swearing in, councilmember John Duran filed a motion to make Horvath the mayor for the coming year, which was approved by the Council unanimously. As a councilmember and mayor, she helped approve the minimum wage of $17.64 per hour and helped with the downsizing of the number of sheriffs in the city.

On April 20, 2020, the City Council chose Horvath as mayor for a second time, with John Heilman as the Mayor Pro Tempore. She was sworn in for a second time on May 18, 2020. Her second term expired on September 20, 2021, to which her Mayor Pro Tempore, Lauren Meister, became mayor for a second time.

Los Angeles County Board of Supervisors 
In 2021, Horvath announced that she was running to replace Sheila Kuehl on the Los Angeles County Board of Supervisors after Kuehl said she would retire. She was challenged by State Senators Robert Hertzberg and Henry Stern, with Stern being eliminated in the primary election after placing third. During her campaign, she received criticism for removing parts of her biography pertaining to West Hollywood. In the general election, Horvath upset Hertzberg with 52.97% of the vote.

References 

California Democrats
Los Angeles County Board of Supervisors
Living people
1983 births
Mayors of places in California
California city council members
University of Notre Dame alumni
Women mayors of places in California
Women city councillors in California
21st-century American politicians
21st-century American women politicians
People from Painesville, Ohio